The 1911–12 New Mexico Lobos men's basketball team represented the University of New Mexico during the 1911–12 NCAA college men's basketball season. The head coach was Ralph Hutchinson, coaching his second season with the Lobos.

Schedule

|-

References

New Mexico Lobos men's basketball seasons
New Mexico